The Aemilia was the flagship of Lieutenant-Admiraal Maarten Harpertszoon Tromp during part of the Eighty Years' War. She was a Dutch 46-gun (later increased in 1637 to 57-gun) ship of the line. Built by Jan Salomonszoon van den Tempel for the Admiralty of Rotterdam in 1632, the ship was the largest Dutch warship built up to that time.

Dimensions
The gundeck length of this ship was measured at 132 Maas feet, equivalent to 144 Amsterdam feet or 133 ft 8 in (in English Imperial measurements). The maximum breadth was 32 Maas feet (equal to 35 ft 3 in Amsterdam feet, or 32 ft 6 in Imperial), and the depth in hold was 13½ Maas feet (equal to 14 ft 2 inches in Amsterdam feet, or 13 ft Imperial).

Service history
In 1635, the ship served as the flagship of Vice-Admiraal Witte Corneliszoon de With. In 1636, now carrying 54 guns, the Aemilia, under Kapitein Gerrit Meyndertszoon den Uyl, was the flagship of Lieutenant-Admiraal Philip van Dorp. She was refitted in 1639 and recommissioned as a 57-gun ship Kapitein Barent Barentszoon Cramer, as the flagship of Lieutenant-Admiraal Maarten Tromp. She then took part in the blockading of Dunkirk, including leading the 12-ship Dutch squadron in the action off Dunkirk on 18 February 1639, and in the action off Beachy Head on 17 September on the same year. At the Battle of the Downs, on 21 October 1639, the vessel fought well under the personal command of Tromp.

She transported Queen Henrietta Marie from England to the Netherlands in February 1643, suffering extensive storm damage in the process. She was sold to France soon after and employed as a privateer in the Mediterranean before being defeated in battle and captured by two unnamed Spanish warships. She was last mentioned being taken to Naples in 1651 where the remains of her hull were scrapped.

References

James Bender, Dutch Warships in the Age of Sail 1600-1714: Design, Construction, Careers and Fates (Seaforth Publishing, Barnsley, 2014) .

External links

Ships of the line of the Dutch Republic
Ships built in Rotterdam
1630s ships